Emmalocera miserabilis is a species of moth of the  family Pyralidae. It was described in 1919 by Embrik Strand and is found in Taiwan and Hong Kong.

References

Moths described in 1919
Emmalocera